Andrejs Perepļotkins (Andriy Igorovych Pereplyotkin; born 27 December 1984) is a Ukrainian born Latvian footballer, who plays primarily as a right winger for SK Super Nova.

Although born in Ukraine, he played internationally for Latvia from 2007 to 2012.

Club career

Early career
Perepļotkins joined Metalist Kharkiv at the age of 18, but over the next two years had spells with several different clubs. Those clubs included Fili Moscow and the famous Belgian club Anderlecht, as well as spending time at Southampton F.C.'s academy. Due to issues in regards to obtaining a work permit, Perepļotkins was unable to play for Southampton in front of a paying crowd, thus preventing him appearing for the first team.

Bohemians and Skonto Rīga
His big break came with Irish side Bohemians, where he played 18 games, scoring three goals and winning the League of Ireland title in 2003, however he was released by Bohs midway through the 2004 season. The Latvian side Skonto Rīga signed Perepļotkins in the beginning of the 2004–05 season. Over the next six years Perepļotkins played 141 Latvian Higher League matches, scoring 44 times and helping the club win the 2004 Latvian Higher League, 2005 Livonia Cup, as well as the Latvian Higher League 2010. While playing with Skonto, Perepļotkins was a regular participant in the UEFA Champions League and UEFA Europa League qualification matches.

Derby County
On 1 August 2008, Perepļotkins joined Derby County on trial and he made his debut in a 2–2 with Dutch side F.C. Utrecht on 3 August. After impressing in training and the game Derby agreed a loan fee with Skonto and signed Perepļotkins on a season long loan on 7 August 2008, alongside Serbian striker Aleksandar Prijović.

Perepļopkins made his full debut against Doncaster on 9 August, being replaced by Steve Davies after 64 minutes. However, he played just once more for Derby and his loan was terminated 6 months in by mutual consent on 15 January 2009 by new Derby manager Nigel Clough.

Nasaf Qarshi and the return to Baltic states
Before the start of the 2011 season Perepļotkins joined the Uzbek League club Nasaf Qarshi, signing a two-year contract. In his first season with Nasaf Perepļotkins scored 7 goals in 24 league appearances and became the team's top scorer. He also helped his club the AFC Cup, scoring the winning goal in the final. Suffering from a long-term injury, Perepļotkins played just 16 matches, scoring once in 2012. In March 2013 he moved back to the Baltic states, joining the Estonian Meistriliiga club Narva Trans on a one-year deal. In his league debut Perepļotkins scored a goal, with the match against Tallinna Kalev ending in a 1–1 draw. Due to continuing injuries his stay in Estonia was not long lasting and in August 2013 Perepļotkins moved back to the Latvian Higher League, joining Daugava Rīga. With 1 goal in 13 league appearances he led the club to its best achievement in history, finishing the season in the top four of the championship.

Ararat Yerevan and ENAD Polis Chrysochous
In February 2014 Perepļotkins moved to the Armenian Premier League club Ararat Yerevan, signing a contract until the end of the season. With 2 goals in 12 appearances he could not manage to lead his club into the top three and, therefore, also the UEFA Europa League spot, with Ararat falling three points short to Mika and ending the season in the fourth position. In August 2014 Perepļotkins joined the Cypriot Second Division club ENAD Polis Chrysochous.

International career
In 2007, after several years of successful performance in the Latvian championship, Perepļotkins was offered the chance to obtain Latvian citizenship and join the national team. He accepted the offer and acquired Latvian citizenship on 16 March 2007, becoming available for selection by Latvia internationally.
Perepļotkins made his international debut for Latvia as they unsuccessfully tried to qualify for Euro 2008. Playing for the national team from 2007 to 2012 Perepļotkins collected 36 caps, scoring three times.

Honours

Skonto
Latvian Higher League: 2004, 2010

Nasaf Qarshi
AFC Cup: 2011

Latvia
Baltic Cup: 2008, 2012

References

External links

1984 births
Living people
Latvian footballers
Latvia international footballers
Latvian expatriate footballers
Ukrainian footballers
Association football wingers
Ukrainian emigrants to Latvia
Footballers from Kharkiv
Skonto FC players
FC Metalist Kharkiv players
Bohemian F.C. players
Southampton F.C. players
R.S.C. Anderlecht players
Derby County F.C. players
JK Narva Trans players
FK Daugava (2003) players
Riga FC players
FC Nasaf players
FC Ararat Yerevan players
FK Jelgava players
League of Ireland players
English Football League players
Meistriliiga players
Cypriot Second Division players
Armenian Premier League players
Latvian Higher League players
Uzbekistan Super League players
AFC Cup winning players
Expatriate footballers in Belgium
Expatriate association footballers in the Republic of Ireland
Expatriate footballers in Russia
Expatriate footballers in England
Expatriate footballers in Uzbekistan
Expatriate footballers in Estonia
Expatriate footballers in Lithuania
Expatriate footballers in Cyprus
Expatriate footballers in Armenia
Latvian expatriate sportspeople in Belgium
Latvian expatriate sportspeople in Estonia
Latvian expatriate sportspeople in Russia
Latvian expatriate sportspeople in England
Latvian expatriate sportspeople in Lithuania
Latvian expatriate sportspeople in Cyprus
Latvian expatriate sportspeople in Armenia
FC Kupiškis players
ENAD Polis Chrysochous players